Maintaining is a 2007-2009 comic strip by cartoonist Nate Creekmore. 

Creekmore is a two-time winner of the Scripps College Cartoonist of the Year and an Associated Press award for achievement in college cartooning. Creekmore's strip first appeared in the newspaper at Lipscomb University in Nashville. Maintaining was later picked up for syndication through Universal Press Syndicate. It was launched on May 7, 2007, and canceled in August 2009 for poor sales.  The last daily strip was August 1, 2009.

References

External links
Nate Creekmore website
Maintaining on GoComics

American comic strips
Gag-a-day comics
2007 comics debuts
2009 comics endings